This is a list of tortilla-based dishes and foods that use the tortilla as a primary ingredient. A tortilla is a type of soft, thin flatbread made from finely ground corn or wheat flour that comes from Mexico and Central America. Originally derived from the corn tortilla (tortilla in Spanish means "small torta", or "small cake"), a bread of maize which predates the arrival of Europeans to the Americas, the wheat flour tortilla was an innovation after wheat was brought to the New World from Spain while this region was the colony of New Spain. It is made with an unleavened, water-based dough, pressed and cooked like corn tortillas.

Tortilla-based dishes

See also

 Corn tortilla
 List of bread dishes
 List of Mexican dishes
 List of rice dishes
 Mexican street food
 New Mexican cuisine
 Tortilla warmer
 Wheat tortilla

References

 
Tortilla-Based Dishes
!